Hermann Conring (November 4, 1894 – February 9, 1989) was a German politician of the Christian Democratic Union (CDU) and former member of the German Bundestag. During the Nazi era he was a provincial commissioner in Groningen, Netherlands.

Life 
In April 1953, he was directly elected to the Lower Saxony Landtag as a substitute for Louis Thelemann, where he remained until 1955. After joining the CDU, he won the direct mandate in the 1953 federal election in the constituency of Leer and was a member of the German Bundestag until 1969. In the fifth legislative period of the Bundestag, he was the third-oldest parliamentarian after Konrad Adenauer and Arthur Enk. From 5 May 1964 to 1969 he was deputy chairman of the Bundestag's Budget Committee.

Literature

References

1894 births
1989 deaths
Members of the Bundestag for Lower Saxony
Members of the Bundestag 1965–1969
Members of the Bundestag 1961–1965
Members of the Bundestag 1957–1961
Members of the Bundestag 1953–1957
Members of the Bundestag for the Christian Democratic Union of Germany
Members of the Landtag of Lower Saxony
Nazi politicians
Commanders Crosses of the Order of Merit of the Federal Republic of Germany